4-track or 4-track tape may refer to:

 The 4-track cartridge as an analogue music storage format popular from the late 1950s
 A 4-track tape for multitrack recording used in professional recording studios
 A quadruple track railway line